The 3rd Voice (also known as The Third Voice) is a 1960 American neo noir thriller crime drama film directed and written by Hubert Cornfield, who also produced the film with Maury Dexter. It is based on the novel All the Way by Charles Williams and stars Edmond O'Brien, Laraine Day (in her final film), and Julie London.

Premise
The Man is the accomplice of Marian Forbes, the spurned mistress of a tycoon. She coaches The Man in impersonating the voice and appearance and habits of the intended victim. The Man begins his masquerade in a Mexican resort, where he meets Corey Scott and moves on to contemplating the murder of his tutor, but things begin to go awry.

Cast
List of the actors in the film: 
 Edmond O'Brien – The Man
 Laraine Day – Marian Forbes
 Julie London – Corey Scott
 Edward Colmans – Carreras
 Shirley O'Hara – Carreras' Secretary
 Ralph Brooks – Harris Chapman
 Abel Franco – Police Inspector
 George Eldredge – Judge Kendall
 Roque Ybarra – 1st Fisherman
 Ruben Moreno – 2nd Fisherman
 Raoul De Leon – Bank Official
 Francisco Ortega – Bank Cashier
 John Garrett – Bank Clerk
 Henry Delgado – Desk Clerk – Palacio
 Andre Oropeza – Desk Clerk – Miramar
 Sylvia Ray – Hotel Miramar Cashier
 Tom Hernández – Other Desk Clerk
 Olga San Juan – Blonde
 George Trevino – Captain Camos
 Lucille Curtis – Mrs. Kendall
 Tom Daly – Tourist at Bar
 Mario Armenta – Orchestra Leader
 Robert Hernandez – Bellhop
 Eddie Le Baron – Carlos
 Manuel Serrano – Headwaiter
 Francis Ravel – Waiter
 Alberto Monte – Photographer

Production
The film was produced by Robert L. Lippert's Associated Producers Incorporated, which produced lower-budget films for 20th Century Fox. Lippert bought the rights to the book and arranged for Hubert Cornfield to adapt and direct. Lippert and Fox president Spyros Skouras increased the budget to a level that co-producer Maury Dexter described as a "nervous A class" of film. The film was shot in and around Los Angeles and Malibu in October 1959.

According to Dexter, during filming, Cornfield accused O'Brien of not knowing his lines and O'Brien threatened to punch Cornfield on the last day of filming, though this may not have happened.

Reception
Dexter claims that the film received positive reviews and "did fairly well at the box office."

In a contemporary review for the New York Times, critic A. H. Weiler called the film "... taut, complex and eerily fascinating for only about three-quarters of the way. A dénouement that seems telegraphed and contrived and some situations that are overly garrulous and static keep 'The Third Voice' from reaching a high pitch of excitement."

The Los Angeles Times called the film an "interesting thriller."

References

External links 
 
 
 

1960 films
1960 crime drama films
1960s crime thriller films
1960s English-language films
20th Century Fox films
American black-and-white films
American crime drama films
American crime thriller films
Films based on American novels
Films directed by Hubert Cornfield
Films scored by Johnny Mandel
1960s Spanish-language films
American neo-noir films
1960s American films